Like a Cat on a Highway 2 is a 2021 Italian comedy film directed by Riccardo Milani, sequel to the 2017 film Like a Cat on a Highway. The film premiered on 26 August 2021.

Cast

References

External links

2021 films
2020s Italian-language films
2021 comedy films
Italian comedy films
Films directed by Riccardo Milani
2020s Italian films